WCXI (1160 kHz) is a commercial AM radio station licensed to Fenton, Michigan.  The station broadcasts to Metro Detroit and the Flint area.  It is owned by the Birach Broadcasting Corporation and it airs a Christian talk and teaching radio format.

By day, WCXI is powered at 15,000 watts.  It uses a directional antenna with a three-tower array.  But 1160 AM is a clear channel frequency reserved for KSL in Salt Lake City, the dominant Class A station.  To protect KSL from interference, WCXI must greatly reduce power at night to 400 watts.  The transmitter is off North Maple Avenue in Milford Charter Township, Michigan.

History
The original call sign was WFEN. It had a Middle of the Road (MOR) format. In its early years, it tried several other formats including country, oldies, urban gospel and classic country.

As of September 2010, WCXI has dropped its classic country format and switched back to oldies in a temporary relocation of the format of sister station WPON 1460 AM in Walled Lake, Michigan.  The station received a construction permit to increase its daytime power to 15,000 watts, effectively making it a suburban Detroit station.  WPON went silent in October 2010 so improvements could be made to its signal with WPON's programming continuing on WCXI.

The WCXI call letters were used in Detroit from the late 1970s to the early 1990s at what is now WDFN 1130 AM, and also in the early 1980s as WCXI-FM at 92.3 FM (now WMXD). It has also been used at 1450 AM in Jackson, Michigan.  Fittingly, all stations previously using the WCXI call sign played country music.

A new transmitter site was proposed in Milford Township, Michigan to serve both WCXI and WPON.

WCXI 1130 was widely known throughout Detroit's large Indian American and South Asian population. It had many shows featuring Hindi and other Indian language songs in the superhit Rockin' Raaga hosted by Anu, Geetmala and Voice of Pakistan.  WPON returned to the air in late 2019 and re-assumed the oldies format that had been airing on WCXI. At that time, WCXI switched to an automated mix of pop music in various languages.

On June 29, 2020 WCXI flipped to talk from Fox News Radio.

May 9, 2022 the station flipped to recordings of the preaching of radio evangelist Brother Stair, heard 24/7.

References

External links

Two entries about WCXI including MP3 airchecks – at the Radio Kitchen blog
Michiguide.com – WCXI History

CXI
News and talk radio stations in the United States
Radio stations established in 1985
Birach Broadcasting Corporation stations
1985 establishments in Michigan
Conservative talk radio